Some Answered Questions (abbreviated SAQ; Persian version: Mufáviḍát-i-‘Abdu'l-Bahá) is a compilation of table talks of ʻAbdu'l-Bahá that were collected by Laura Clifford Barney between 1904 and 1906 across several pilgrimages. The book was first published in English in 1908. ʻAbdu'l-Bahá was the son of Baháʼu'lláh, the founder of the Baháʼí Faith, and was appointed by him as his successor and interpreter of his words.

The book covers a variety of subjects, including religion, philosophy, science, human evolution, immortality of the soul, labor strikes, reincarnation, and a variety of Christian topics.

History
ʻAbdu'l-Bahá's answers were first written down in Persian by a secretary, and afterwards revised twice by ʻAbdu'l-Bahá.

A new English translation revised by a committee at the Baháʼí World Centre was published in 2014 and made available in early 2015.

Overview
The book is divided into five parts:

I. On the Influence of the Prophets in the Evolution of Humanity
Part one covers topics such as the one universal law that governs nature, rational and spiritual proofs of the existence of God, Manifestations of God (Abraham, Moses, Christ, Muhammad, (includes His wives and battles), the Báb, and Baháʼu'lláh), and Biblical prophecies from chapters 8, 9 and 12 of the Book of Daniel (see Day-year principle), chapter 11 of the Book of Isaiah and chapters 11 and 12 of the Book of Revelation.

II. Some Christian Subjects
Part two consists of subjects of Christian interest, such as  the significance of symbolism ("intelligible realities and their expression through sensible forms"), an examination and breakdown of various verses from the Bible, the story of Adam and Eve, the birth of Christ, the greatness of Christ, baptism, miracles, the Eucharist, Peter and the Papacy, the resurrection of Christ, the Holy Spirit, the second coming of Christ, the Day of Judgement, the Trinity, sin, blasphemy, and predestination.

III. On the Powers and Conditions of the Manifestations of God
Part three speaks about topics such as the five aspects of spirit, the stations, power and influence of the Manifestations of God, universal cycles, the two classes of Prophets, God's rebukes to the Prophets and infallibility.

IV. On the Origin, Powers and Conditions of Man
The fourth part includes a commentary on the theory of evolution, the origin of the universe, the difference between man and animal, the origin of man, the difference between the soul, mind, and spirit, human nature, the origin of the spirit and mind of man, the relationship between the spirit and the body, the relationship between God and man (emanationism), the physical and intellectual powers of man, the differences of character in men, the degree of knowledge man possesses and the knowledge the Manifestations of God possess, man's knowledge of God, the immortality of the spirit, the state and progress of the spirit after death, fate, the influence of the stars, free will, visions, dreams and communication with spirits, and spiritual and physical healing.

V. Miscellaneous Subjects
Part five goes into topics such as the nonexistence of evil, two kinds of torment, the justice and mercy of God, the punishment of criminals, strikes, reality, pre-existence, reincarnation, pantheism ('Unity of Existence'), four kinds of comprehension, and ethics.

See also
 Baháʼí cosmology
 Baháʼí Faith and science
 Baháʼí Faith and the unity of religion
 Kitáb-i-Íqán
 Tablet to Dr. Forel

References

Further reading

 Kluge, Ian (2009). Some Answered Questions: A Philosophical Perspective, in Lights of Irfan, Volume 10.
 Ma'ani, Baharieh Rouhani (2017). Some Answered Questions" and Its Compiler, in Lights of Irfan 18.
 Oliveira, Marco (2020). Some Answered Questions: An Introduction to Bahá’í Teachings. Wilmette Institute.
 Ruhi Institute. Spirit of Faith.
 Ruhi Institute. The Power of the Holy Spirit.

External links
 E-book version of Some Answered Questions - 2014 translation (Epub and Mobi formats)
 Some Answered Questions in many languages
Some Answered Questions in Persian (Egypt, 1920)
 2014 translation, side-by-side with the 1908 translation
 
 A Pocketful of Meaning, compilation of terms, phrases and symbols used in Sacred Writings
 Related material on Baháʼí Library Online

1908 books
Works by `Abdu'l-Bahá
1908 in religion